Jules Yves Stephane Baga (born 14 June 1987 in Yaoundé) is a Cameroonian football player, who plays for Eding Sport FC.

Honours
Chonburi - 2007 Thailand Premier League
Chonburi - 2010 Thai FA Cup

References

External links

Jules Baga profile at the Chonburi website
Jules Baga profile at the Liga Indonesia website

1982 births
Living people
Cameroonian footballers
Cameroonian expatriate footballers
Expatriate footballers in Ukraine
Cameroonian expatriate sportspeople in Ukraine
Association football forwards
Expatriate footballers in Thailand
Ukrainian Premier League players
FC Zorya Luhansk players
Jules Baga
Cameroonian expatriate sportspeople in Thailand
Footballers from Yaoundé
Eding Sport FC players
UMS de Loum players